Joshua Wright may refer to:

Joshua D. Wright, legal academic and former Commissioner of the U.S. Federal Trade Commission
Joshua Wright (Alaska politician) (1929–2017), member of the state House of Representatives 
Joshua Wright (mayor), mayor of Trenton, New Jersey from 1803 to 1806
J. Butler Wright (1877–1939), American diplomat
Josh Wright (English footballer born 1989)
Josh Wright (footballer, born 1988)